Frédéric Kuhn (born 10 July 1968 in Gennevilliers, Hauts-de-Seine) is a retired male hammer thrower from France, who competed at the 1992 Summer Olympics in Barcelona, Spain. He set his personal best (76.80 metres) on 30 May 1992 at a meet in Angers.

Achievements

References

Profile

1968 births
Living people
People from Gennevilliers
French male hammer throwers
Athletes (track and field) at the 1992 Summer Olympics
Olympic athletes of France
Sportspeople from Hauts-de-Seine